Employee of the Month may refer to:

 Employee of the Month (program), a program which involves giving out business award to employees of a particular business on a monthly basis, a popular tradition in North America
 Employee of the Month (podcast), a comedy talk show and podcast hosted by Catie Lazarus who interviews famous people about their jobs 
 Employee of the Month (2004 film), a black comedy movie starring Matt Dillon and Christina Applegate
 Employee of the Month (2006 film), a movie starring Dane Cook and Jessica Simpson
 "Employee of the Month" (The Sopranos), an episode of The Sopranos (Season 3, 2001)
 "Employee of the Month", an episode of General Hospital: Night Shift (Season 1, 2007)
 "Employee of the Month", an episode of SpongeBob SquarePants (Season 1, 1999)
 "Employee of the Month", an episode of Teen Titans (Season 4, 2005)
 "Employee of the Month", a song from the episode of SpongeBob SquarePants (Season 1, 1999)
 Employee of the Month, a 1998 album by Austin Lounge Lizards
 Employee of the Month EP, a 2002 EP by Relient K